This is a list of deities of Dungeons & Dragons, including all of the 3.5 edition gods and powers of the "Core Setting" for the Dungeons & Dragons (D&D) roleplaying game. Religion is a key element of the D&D game, since it is required to support both the cleric class and the behavioural aspects of the ethical alignment system – 'role playing', one of three fundamentals. The pantheons employed in D&D provide a useful framework for creating fantasy characters, as well as governments and even worlds. Dungeons and Dragons may be useful in teaching classical mythology. D&D draws inspiration from a variety of mythologies, but takes great liberty in adapting them for the purpose of the game. Because the Core Setting of 3rd Edition is based on the World of Greyhawk, the Greyhawk gods list contains many of the deities listed here, and many more.

Publication history
The first official publication to detail god-like beings for use in the Dungeons & Dragons game was Gods, Demi-Gods & Heroes, published in 1976 as the fourth supplement for the original edition. This work was superseded by the Deities & Demigods source book, which was first published in 1980. The first printing included the Cthulhu Mythos, but both this and the Melnibonéan mythos were removed by the third printing because of potential copyright issues. In 1985, the book was renamed Legends & Lore due to concerns about bad publicity. The Babylonian, Finnish, nonhuman, and Sumerian content were removed to allow room for expansion of the remaining mythoi.

In 1992, Monster Mythology was published as a sourcebook for the second edition of Dungeons & Dragons. This work re-introduced detailed information on the deities of several non-human pantheons. The Faerûnian pantheon for the Forgotten Realms campaign setting was more fully detailed in 1996–1998 with the publication of Faiths & Avatars, Powers & Pantheons and Demihuman Deities.

Categories
The deities are grouped into three categories:
 Core powers – Deities presented in the Player's Handbook 3.5th edition or substantially introduced in the other two core books (Dungeon Master's Guide and Monster Manual). Most of these deities are worshipped by humans. There is a subset within this category called Additional Deities which has deities not mentioned in the core rulebooks but instead in supplements and as such considered additions to the core category.
 Alternate human pantheons – This lists the pantheons and the deities within them that are presented in the supplement book Deities & Demigods. Most are based upon real-life mythology.
 Non-deity powers – These beings would fit into the previous category, but are not actually deities, plus most of them aren't the patron of a specific monstrous race. This includes the demon princes and archdevils as well as some other godlike beings.

Before third edition, there was no Core Setting, so the distinctions above are not as clear-cut. For the most part, materials which did not specify a setting were assumed to be at least compatible with the World of Greyhawk if not outright parts of the canon. As such, those prior materials are covered in the setting-specific lists of deities.

The book Monster Mythology, however, was considered to be canon for core materials for the gods of non-human races in second edition.

Characteristics
Like in e.g. Greek mythology, deities in Dungeons & Dragons have a great variety of moral outlooks and motives which have to be considered by cleric player characters. In some editions of the game, deities were given statistics, allowing powerful player characters to kill a god like a powerful monster. For gaming purposes, they are also differentiated by a number of standardized characteristics:

Ranks of divine power
Each deity has a divine rank, which determines how much power the entity has, from lowest to highest:
Quasi-deities or hero deities. Beings of this rank are immortal but usually cannot grant spells to worshippers.
Demigods. They are the weakest of the deities, and are able to grant spells and perform a few deeds that are beyond mortal limits.
Lesser deities. These entities can perform more powerful deeds than demigods can, and have keener senses where their portfolios are concerned.
Intermediate deities. These entities control larger godly realms than demigods or lesser gods.
Greater deities. These entities typically have millions of mortal worshippers, and they command respect even among other deities. Some rule over pantheons of other deities.
Overdeities. These entities are beyond the understanding and knowledge of mortals and care nothing for worshippers.

Portfolios
Every deity has certain aspects of existence over which it has dominion, power, and control. Collectively, these aspects represent a deity's portfolio.

Domains
Each deity that can grant spells has multiple domains that give clerics access to extra spells and abilities from that domain. Which domains are associated with a deity is largely a function of the deity's portfolio.

Divine hierarchy
Many deities are arranged in pantheons, which are often led by Greater deities which are their direct superiors. The individual deities in a pantheon may not be forced to obey their superiors, although they typically respect and fear the superior deity.

Dungeons & Dragons
Gods, Demi-Gods & Heroes (1976) included 10 pantheons of gods: 

 Egyptian Mythos
 Greek Mythos
 Hindu Mythos
 Celtic Mythos
 Norse Mythos
 Finnish Mythos
 Chinese Mythos
 Japanese Mythos
 Aztec Mythos
 Mayan Mythos
 Hyborea Mythos (from Robert E. Howard's works)
 Melnibonéan Mythos (from Michael Moorcock's Elric novels)

Advanced Dungeons & Dragons
The original edition of Deities & Demigods contained 17 pantheons of gods:
 American Indian mythos
 Arthurian heroes
 Babylonian mythos
 Celtic mythos
 Central American mythos (i.e. Aztec and Maya)
 Chinese mythos
 Cthulhu Mythos (from H. P. Lovecraft and related fiction)
 Egyptian mythos
 Elric mythos (from Michael Moorcock's Elric novels)
 Finnish mythos
 Greek mythos and heroes
 Indian mythos
 Japanese mythos
 Nehwon mythos (from Fritz Leiber's Lankhmar novels)
 Nonhuman's Deities (original TSR creations)
 Norse mythos
 Sumerian mythos

Advanced Dungeons & Dragons 2nd edition
Legends & Lore was expanded, completely revised from the 1st Edition AD&D volume, and rewritten for the 2nd Edition rules. This edition had pared-down content in comparison to the original; the sections on Babylonian, Finnish, Sumerian and non-humanoid deities were wholly excised. The Central American mythos was renamed the Aztec mythos, while the Nehwon mythos was retained.

The book Monster Mythology (1992) included over 100 deities for nonhumans.
Gods of the Demihumans
Gods of the Elves: Corellon Larethian, Sehanine Moonbow, Aerdrie Faenya, Erevan Ilesere, Fenmarel Mestarine, Hanali Celanil, Labelas Enoreth, Solonor Thelandira, Lafarallinn
Gods of the Dwarves: Moradin, Berronar Truesilver, Clanggedin Silverbeard, Dugmaren Brightmantle, Dumathoin, Muamman Duathal, Vergadain, Abbathor, Gnarldan Steelshield
Gods of the Gnomes: Garl Glittergold, Baervan Wildwanderer, Baravar Cloakshadow, Flandal Steelskin, Gaerdal Ironhand, Nebelun, Segojan Earthcaller, Urdlen
Gods of the Halflings: Yondalla, Arvoreen, Brandobaris, Cyrrollalee, Sheela Peryroyl, Urogalan, Kaldair Swiftfoot
Goblinoid Deities
Gods of the Orcs: Gruumsh, Bahgtru, Ilneval, Luthic, Shargaas, Yurtrus, Gerdreg
Gods of the Goblins: Maglubiyet, Khurgorbaeyag, Nomog-Geaya, Bargrivyek
Gods of the Bugbears: Hruggek, Grankhul, Skiggaret
Gods of the Kobolds: Kurtulmak, Gaknulak
Other Goblinoid Deities: Kuraulyek, Meriadar, Stalker
Gods of the Underdark
Gods of the Drow: Lolth, Kiaransalee, Vhaeraun, Zinzerena
Gods of the Underdark Dwarves: Laduguer, Diirinka, Diinkarazan
The Lost Gods: The Elder Elemental God, Juiblex, The Dark God
Gods of the Illithids: Ilsensine, Maanzecorian
Gods of the Myconids: Psilofyr
Gods of the Beholders: Great Mother, Gzemnid
Gods of the Svirfnebli: Callarduran Smoothhands
The Giant Gods, Annam, Stronmaus, Hiatea, Grolantor, Iallanis, Karontor, Memnor, Skoraeus Stonebones, Diancastra; The Interloper Gods: Baphomet, Kostchtchie, Vaprak, Yeenoghu, Gorellik
Gods of the Seas and Skies: Deep Sashelas, Demogorgon, Eadro, Jazirian, Koriel, Panzuriel, Persana, Quorlinn, Remnis, Sekolah, Surminare, Syranita, Trishina, Water Lion, Stillsong
Gods of the Scaly Folk: Blibdoolpoolp, Laogzed, Merrshaulk, Parrafaire, Ramenos, Semuanya, Sess'Innek, Shekinester; Io, Aasterinian, Bahamut, Chronepsis, Faluzure, Tiamat
Gods of the Dark Folk: Cegilune, Kanchelsis, Mellifleur, Squerrik, Balador, Ferrix, Daragor, Eshebala
The Sylvan Gods: Titania, Oberon, Caoimhin, Damh, Eachthighern, Emmantiensien, Fionnghuala, Nathair Sgiathach, Skerrit, Squelaiche, Verenestra, Queen of Air and Darkness

Dungeons & Dragons 3rd edition
There are over 100 deities in the Greyhawk setting, and when creating Dungeons & Dragons 3rd Edition Wizards of the Coast selected a subset to become iconic deities. They selected and altered deities to correspond to "iconic" aspects of core D&D. Most core deities are human deities; except for the chief gods of the demihuman races. Certain aspects of the deities were altered to make them more generic – for example: the "Core" Heironeous favors the longsword (in order to make the favored weapon of the "God of Chivalry" more traditionally knight-like), as contrasted with the original "Greyhawk" Heironeous, who favors the battleaxe.

The designation of "greater" vs. "intermediate" comes from Legends & Lore (1990). It is not used in any edition of the Player's Handbook, but it is used in Deities and Demigods (2002) and various v3.5 Edition materials.

Core D&D-pantheons

Greater deities
Boccob, god of magic, arcane knowledge, balance and foresight.
Corellon Larethian, god of elves, magic, music, and arts (also a demihuman power).
Garl Glittergold, god of gnomes, humor, and gemcutting (also a demihuman power).
Gruumsh, god of orcs (also a monster power).
Moradin, god of dwarves (also a demihuman power)
Nerull, god of death, darkness, murder and the underworld.
Pelor, god of sun, light, strength and healing. More humans worship Pelor than any other deity.
Yondalla, goddess of halflings (also a demihuman power).

Intermediate deities
Ehlonna, goddess of forests, woodlands, flora & fauna, and fertility.
Erythnul, god of hate, envy, malice, panic, ugliness, and slaughter.
Fharlanghn, god of horizons, distance, travel, and roads.
Heironeous, god of chivalry, justice, honor, war, daring, and valor.
Hextor, god of war, discord, massacres, conflict, fitness, and tyranny.
Kord, god of athletics, sports, brawling, strength, and courage.
Obad-Hai, god of nature, freedom, hunting, and beasts.
Olidammara, god of music, revels, wine, rogues, humor, and tricks.
Saint Cuthbert, god of common sense, wisdom, zeal, honesty, truth, and discipline.
 Wee Jas, goddess of magic, death, vanity, and law

Lesser deities
Vecna, god of destructive and evil secrets.

Supplementary pantheons
Although not listed in the Players Handbook, these deities are listed as part of the default D&D pantheon in new works and as such are regarded as additions to the default pantheon. Although some of these originally come from the Greyhawk, Forgotten Realms, or Eberron campaign settings, each one is mentioned at some point in a non-setting-specific source. The name in brackets next to each one specifies the source they are mentioned in.

Aengrist, god of order in the Frostfell and knights of the Order of the Iron Glacier (Frostburn)
Hleid, goddess of animals of the Frostfell, cold magic, uldras (Frostburn)
Iborighu, god of Frostfell dangers and eternal winter (Frostburn)
The Mockery, god of treachery over honor. (Stormwrack)

Greater deities
Aurifar, greater god of the midday sun, life and judgement. (Sandstorm)
Incabulos, greater god of plagues, sickness, famine, nightmares, drought and disasters. (Complete Divine)
Istus, greater goddess of fate, destiny, divination, future and honesty. (Complete Divine)
Rao, greater god of peace, reason and serenity. (Complete Divine)
Zarus, greater god of humanity, domination and perfection. (Races of Destiny)

Intermediate deities
Auril, intermediate goddess of cold, winter, and ice (Frostburn)
Celestian, intermediate god of stars, space and wanderers. (Complete Divine)
Dallah Thaun, the dark aspect of Yondalla. Intermediate Goddess of secrets, guile, lies, half-truths, flattery, intrigue, manipulation, and all things done by stealth. (Races of the Wild)
Karura, intermediate god of the sands, and goddess of the burning wastelands. She rules over the temperate and warm wastelands. (Sandstorm)
Kurtulmak, intermediate god of trapmaking, mining and war. (also the monster power of kobolds) (Deities & Demigods)
Lolth, intermediate goddess of the drow, spiders, evil and darkness. (also the monster power of Drow and a nondeity power) (Deities & Demigods)
Pholtus, intermediate god of light, resolution, law and order. (Complete Divine)
Procan, intermediate god of seas, sea life, salt, sea weather and navigation. (Complete Divine, Stormwrack)
Tem-Et-Nu, intermediate goddess of rivers, wealth, victory and life. (Sandstorm)
Tharizdun, intermediate god of eternal darkness, decay, entropy, malign knowledge and insanity. (Complete Divine)
Trithereon, intermediate god of individuality, liberty, retribution and self-defense. (Complete Divine)
Umberlee, intermediate goddess of anger, wrath, storms and tidal waves. (Stormwrack)

Lesser deities
Afflux, lesser god of inquiry, necromancy and death. (Libris Mortis)
Al-Ishtus, lesser god of scorpions and venom. (Sandstorm)
Altua, lesser goddess of honor and nobility. (Complete Warrior)
Bahamut, lesser god of good (metallic) dragons, wisdom and the wind. (also the monster power of good dragons) (Deities & Demigods)
Beltar, lesser goddess of malice, caves and pits. (Complete Divine)
Bralm, lesser goddess of insects and industriousness. (Complete Divine)
Cyndor, lesser god of time, infinity and continuity. (Complete Divine)
Delleb, lesser god of reason, intellect and study. (Complete Divine)
Evening Glory, lesser goddess of love, beauty and immortality through undeath. (Libris Mortis)
Geshtai, lesser goddess of lakes, rivers, wells and streams. (Complete Divine, Stormwrack)
Halmyr, lesser god of strategy and skill in warfare. (Complete Warrior)
Joramy, lesser goddess of fire, volcanoes, wrath, anger and quarrels. (Complete Divine, Sandstorm)
Karaan, lesser god of lycanthropy, cannibalism, wild savagery and urban decay. (Book of Vile Darkness)
Konkresh, lesser god of brute force. (Complete Warrior)
Lirr, lesser goddess of prose, poetry, literature and art. (Complete Divine)
Llerg, lesser god of beasts and strength. (Complete Divine)
Lyris, lesser goddess of victory and fate. (Complete Warrior)
Mouqol, lesser god of trade, negotiation, ventures, appraisal and reciprocity. (Complete Divine)
Nadirech, lesser god of cowardice, trickery and luck. (Complete Warrior)
Osprem, lesser goddess of sea voyages, ships and sailors. (Complete Divine, Stormwrack)
Pyremius, lesser god of fire, poison and murder. (Complete Divine)
Rallaster, lesser god of razors, mutilation, murder, insanity and torture. (Book of Vile Darkness)
Solanil, lesser goddess of oases and hospitality. (Sandstorm)
Sulerain, lesser goddess of death and slaughter. (Complete Warrior)
Syreth, lesser goddess of guardians and protection. (Complete Warrior)
Telchur, lesser god of winter, cold and the north wind. (Complete Divine, Frostburn)
Tiamat, lesser goddess of evil (chromatic) dragons, conquest, greed and cruelty. (also the monster power of evil dragons) (Deities & Demigods)
Typhos, lesser god of tyranny. (Complete Warrior)
Urbanus, lesser god of cities, growth and improvement. (Races of Destiny)
Valkar, lesser god of courage. (Complete Warrior)
Vatun, lesser god of northern barbarians, cold, winter and Arctic beasts. (Frostburn)
The Xammux, lesser composite god(s) of analytical thinking, forbidden lore, experimentation and amorality. (Book of Vile Darkness)
Xan Yae, lesser goddess of twilight, shadows, stealth and mental powers. (Complete Divine)
Zoser, lesser god of wind, tornadoes and dervishes. (Sandstorm)

Demigods
Ayailla, demigoddess of light, celestial radiance, and good creatures of the sky. (Book of Exalted Deeds)
Cas, demigod of spite. (Heroes of Horror)
Chaav, demigod of enjoyment, delight, and pleasure. (Book of Exalted Deeds)
Doresain, demigod of necromancy. (also the monster power of ghouls) (Libris Mortis)
Estanna, demigoddess of hearth and home. (Book of Exalted Deeds)
Iuz, demigod of deceit, pain, oppression and evil. (Complete Divine)
Kyuss, demigod of creation and mastery of undead. (Dragon Magazine #336)
Lastai, demigoddess of pleasure, love, and passion. (Book of Exalted Deeds)
Phieran, demigod of suffering, endurance, and perseverance. (Book of Exalted Deeds)
Selen, demigoddess of outcasts. (Races of Destiny)
Valarian, demigod of forest, forest creatures, and good-aligned magical creatures. (Book of Exalted Deeds)
Valkur, demigod of sailors, ships, favorable winds and naval combat. (Stormwrack)
Yeathan, demigod of drowning, aquatic calamities, watery death and dark water. (Book of Vile Darkness, Stormwrack)
Zagyg, demigod of humor, eccentricity, occult lore and unpredictability. (Dragon Magazine #338)
Zuoken, demigod of physical and mental mastery. (Complete Divine, Expanded Psionics Handbook)

Other pantheons
The third edition version of Deities & Demigods contains only four pantheons:
 A condensed Greyhawk pantheon meant for insertion into any game world ("Core D&D Pantheon")
 Greek mythos and heroes ("Olympian Pantheon"), among them: Zeus, Aphrodite, Apollo, Ares, Artemis, Athena, Demeter, Dionysus, Hades, Hecate, Hephaestus, Hera, Hercules, Hermes, Hestia, Nike, Pan, Poseidon, and Tyche.
 Egyptian mythos ("Pharaonic Pantheon"), among them: Re-Horakthy, Anubis, Apep, Bast, Bes, Hathor, Imhotep, Isis, Nephthys, Osiris, Ptah, Set, Sobek and Thoth
 Norse mythos ("Asgardian Pantheon"), among them: Odin, Aegir, Balder, Forseti, Frey, Freya, Frigga, Heimdall, Hel, Hermod, Loki, Njord, Odur, Sif, Skadi, Surtur, Thor, Thrym, Tyr and Uller

The third edition version of the book also discusses in detail how one would go about the creation of their own pantheon, as well as individual gods, for use in Dungeons & Dragons.

These three alternative faiths were described in the third edition Deities and Demigods book.

The Faith of the Sun
The Faith of the Sun is a fictional, monotheistic religion presented in and constructed according to the guidelines given for monotheistic religions in 3rd Edition Deities and Demigods. Being monotheistic, it of course consists of only one deity (though said deity is described as having two aspects; a creator one and a destroyer one):

Taiia, greater goddess of creation, destruction, mortal life and death.

Following the Light
Following the Light is a fictional dualistic religion presented in and constructed according to the guidelines given for dualistic religions in 3rd Edition Deities and Demigods. Being dualistic, it consists of two, polar-opposite deities:

Elishar, intermediate deity of positive energy, light and prophecy.
Toldoth, intermediate deity of negative energy, darkness and destruction.

Dennari
The faith of Dennari is a fictional mystery cult, presented in and constructed according to the guidelines given for mystery cults in 3rd Edition Deities & Demigods. It worships a single deity of the same name:

Dennari, lesser goddess of earth, liberation and suffering.

Nondeity powers 
Similar to monster powers, these are not true deities but very powerful extraplanar beings. These however do not even profess to be gods (though many still have designs on godhood).

Fiendish entities

Demon lords of the Abyss 
The single unifying feature of all demon lords (also called demon princes) is the inherent control over part of the infinite layers of The Abyss. Only the first 666 layers of The Abyss are generally known, and of those only a small fraction of the princes of those layers are a part of the D&D cosmology.
Baphomet, Prince of Beasts, demon prince of beasts and vengeance (also the monster power of minotaurs)
Dagon, demon prince and patron of the deep sea.
Demogorgon, self-proclaimed "Prince of Demons".
Eltab, demon prince of hatred and retribution.
Fraz-Urb'luu, demon prince and patron of illusionists and tricksters.
Graz'zt, demon prince and patron of rulers by force.
Juiblex, demon prince and patron of oozes and slimes.
Kostchtchie, demon prince of the 23rd layer of The Abyss, the Ice Wastes; patron of evil frost giants.
Lolth, demon princess of spiders, evil, darkness, chaos and assassins. (also a core power and the monster power of Drow)
Malcanthet, demon queen of the succubi and patron of the hedonistic and lustful.
Obox-ob, demon prince and patron of vermin.
Orcus, demon prince of the 113th layer of The Abyss, Thanatos and patron of the undead.
Pale Night, demon princess and theorized mother of the demon lords.
Pazuzu, demon prince of the 503rd layer of the Abyss.
Sess'Innek, demon prince of civilization and dominion. (also the monster power of dark nagas and lizard kings)
Vaprak, demon prince of combat and greed. (also the monster power of ogres and trolls)
Yeenoghu, demon prince and patron of gnolls.
Zuggtmoy, demon princess and "Lady of the Fungi".
Numerous others.

Arch-devils of Baator 
Bel, an arch-devil, ruler of Avernus, the 1st layer of the Nine Hells.
Dispater, an arch-devil, ruler of Dis, the 2nd layer of the Nine Hells.
Mammon, an arch-devil, ruler of Minauros, the 3rd layer of the Nine Hells.
Belial, an arch-devil, and Fierna, his daughter, co-rulers of Phlegethos, the 4th layer of the Nine Hells.
Levistus, an arch-devil, ruler of Stygia, the 5th layer of the Nine Hells.
Glasya, an arch-devil, ruler of Malboge, the 6th layer of the Nine Hells.
Baalzebul, an arch-devil, ruler of Maladomini, the 7th layer of the Nine Hells.
Mephistopheles, an arch-devil, ruler of Cania, the 8th layer of the Nine Hells.
Asmodeus, an arch-devil, ruler of Nessus, the 9th layer of the Nine Hells and overlord of all the other Arch-devils.

Celestial paragons
The celestial paragons are powerful unique outsiders of the Upper Planes. They are to the celestials as the archdevils are to the devils and the demon lords are to demons.

Archon paragons
The celestial paragons of the archons are known collectively as the Celestial Hebdomad. They rule the layers of the Plane of Mount Celestia.

Barachiel
 ruler of the Silver Heaven of Lunia, the bottom layer of Celestia.
Domiel
 ruler of the Golden Heaven of Mercuria, the second layer of Celestia.
Erathaol
 ruler of Venya, the Pearly Heaven, the third layer of Celestia.
Pistis Sophia
 ruler of Solania, the Crystal Heaven, the fourth layer of Celestia.
Raziel
 ruler of Mertion, the Platinum Heaven, the fifth layer of Celestia.
Sealtiel
 ruler of Jovar, the Glittering Heaven, the sixth layer of Celestia.
Zaphkiel
 ruler of the Illuminated Heaven of Chronias, the seventh layer of Celestia.

Eladrin paragons
The celestial paragons of the eladrins are collectively known as The Court of Stars. They hail from the Plane of Arborea.

Faerinaal
 oversees the defense of the Court of Stars and liberates eladrins captured by evil forces.
Gwynharwyf
 Queen Morwel's loyal champion and a barbarian of unparalleled ferocity.
Morwel
 the ruler of the eladrins and the Court of Stars.

Guardinal paragons
The celestial paragons of the guardinals are collectively known as Talisid and the Five Companions. They hail from the plane of Elysium.

Bharrai
 the matriarch of the Ursinals, resides on Eronia, the second layer of Elysium.
Kharash
 the paragon of Lupinals.
Manath
 the duke of the Cervidals.
Sathia
 the voice of the Avorals, and matron and muse for painters and sculptors.
Talisid
 the most powerful of Leonals. Spends most of his time on Amoria, the topmost layer of Elysium.
Vhara
 the duchess of the Equinals, resides on Amoria.

Archomentals 
Archomentals are powerful exemplary beings of the Elemental Planes and the rulers of the elementals. Although they are not truly rulers of their planes, archomentals like to consider themselves as much and often grant themselves regal titles like Prince or Princess. They are compared in the source material to the archfiends or celestial paragons, and are considered to be the elemental equivalent of such beings.

Evil archomentals 
The evil archomentals are collectively known as the Princes of Elemental Evil. The five most famous are:

Cryonax, prince of evil cold creatures.
Imix, prince of evil fire creatures.
Ogrémoch, prince of evil earth creatures.
Olhydra, princess of evil water creatures.
Yan-C-Bin, prince of evil air creatures.

Good archomentals 
The good archomentals are collectively known as the Elemental Princes of Good. The four most famous are:

Ben-hadar, prince of good water creatures.
Chan, princess of good air creatures.
Entemoch and Sunnis, prince and princess of good earth creatures.
Zaaman Rul, prince of good fire creatures.

Lesser evil archomentals
Three other archomentals are first mentioned in Manual of the Planes (TSR, 1987).
 
Bwimb, prince of ooze creatures.
Chlimbia, prince of magma creatures. In The Inner Planes (TSR, 1998) he is described as evil tyrant.
Ehkahk, prince of smoke creatures.

Slaad Lords 
The Slaad Lords are the de facto rules of the Slaadi race and the plane of Limbo. Though true to their chaotic nature they often do not appear anything like other Slaadi.

Chourst, lord of randomness.
Rennbuu, lord of colors.
Ssendam, lord of madness.
Wartle, domain unknown.
Ygorl, lord of entropy.

Primus 
Primus is the leader of the modrons and is the epitome of order, and possesses god-like powers in the game. Artist Tony DiTerlizzi became fascinated by Primus and the other modrons when he got the challenge to redesign them from their first edition appearance for the Planescape campaign setting. Reviewer Scott Haring found the process successful as the "once-silly Modrons" were "given a new background and purpose that makes a lot more sense".

Titans 
"Titans are closer to the well spring of life and thus experience more pronounced emotion including Deity-like fits of rage. In ages past some rebelled against the deities themselves..."

The Lady of Pain 
The Lady of Pain is an enigmatic being who oversees the city of Sigil in the plane of the Outlands. Almost nothing is known about her; her origin, her race, her motives and her level of power are all obscure, although she is sometimes shown to have absolutely immense power. The Lady of Pain refuses to tolerate anyone who worships her, killing those who do so. Again; virtually nothing is known about her, apart from the fact that she has the power to slay gods who displease her.

Vestiges 
These entities are outside the boundary of life, death, and undeath. They are untouchable by even the most powerful deities although they can be summoned and used by the weakest mortal through pact magic and binding. Binders are often feared and hunted down by "Witch Slayers." The list of vestiges that can be bonded with include:

Acererak: The Eternal.
Agares: Truth Betrayed.
Amon: The Void Before The Altar.
Andras: The Grey Knight.
Andromalius: The Repentant Rogue.
Aym: Queen Avarice.
Balam: The Bitter Angel.
Buer: Grandmother Huntress.
Chupoclops: Harbinger of Forever.
Dahlver-Nar: The Tortured One.
Dantalion: The Star Emperor.
Eligor: Dragon's Slayer.
Eurynome: Mother of the Material.
Focalor: Prince of Tears.
Geryon: The Deposed Lord.
Haagenti: Mother of Minotaurs.
Halphax: Angel in the Angle.
Haures: The Dreaming Duke.
Ipos: Prince of Fools.
Karsus: Hubris in the Blood.
Leraje: The Green Herald.
Malphas: The Turnfeather.
Marchosias: King of Killers.
Naberius: The Grinning Hound.
Orthos: Sovereign of the Howling Dark.
Otiax: The Key to the Gate.
Paimon: The Dancer.
Ronove: The Iron Maiden.
Savnok: The Instigator.
Shax: Sea Sister.
Tenebrous: The Shadow That Was.
Zagan: Duke of Disappointment.

Vestiges were introduced in D&D: Tome of Magic supplement 
by Matthew Sernett, Ari Marmell, David Noonan, Robert J. Schwalb. Wizards of the Coast (C) March 2006.

The supplement Dragon Magic, by Rodney Thompson and Owen Stephens published in September 2006, introduces this vestige:
Ashardalon: Pyre of the Unborn

Wizards of the Coast created these vestiges online:
Vanus: the Reviled One
Astaroth: Unjustly Fallen, and Desharis: the Sprawling Soul
Arete: the First Elan, Gorn-Rujsha-Mintar: the Triad, and Abism: the Schismad
Zceryll: the Star Spawn

Dungeons & Dragons 4th edition
These are the deities for the non-Greyhawk default campaign setting of 4th edition Dungeons & Dragons (informally referred to as the "points of light" setting). The list includes long-time D&D establishments from Greyhawk and the Forgotten Realms, as well as several original gods. Although some gods are patrons of specific races, they are worshipped by all, and racial pantheons do not exist in this edition. Many lesser gods from previous editions (such as the Seldarine or most members of the dwarven pantheon) now have the status of Exarch, a demipower in service to a greater god.

Good and Lawful Good deities
Avandra – Good Goddess of Change, Luck and Travel, Patron of Halflings. She is revered by rogues, travelers, and merchants, and is the enemy of Zehir, Asmodeus, and Torog.
Bahamut – Lawful Good God of Justice, Protection and Nobility. Patron of Dragonborn.
Moradin – Lawful Good God of Family, Community and Creation (as in smithing). Patron of Dwarves
Pelor – Good God of Sun, Agriculture and Time. Seasonal God of Summer.

Unaligned deities
Corellon – Unaligned God of Beauty, Art, Magic and the Fey. Seasonal God of the Spring and Patron of Eladrin.
Erathis – Unaligned Goddess of Civilization, Inventions and Law.
Ioun – Unaligned Goddess of Knowledge, Skill and Prophecy. Ioun is an ally of Corellon, Erathis and Pelor. She is the antithesis of Vecna, as she urges her followers to share all knowledge that he would keep hidden. Ioun is the second most popular deity among metallic dragons, second only to Bahamut. Her name is derived from the Ioun stones.
Kord – Unaligned God of Storms, Battle and Strength.
Melora – Unaligned Goddess of Wilderness, Nature and the Sea
Raven Queen – Unaligned Goddess of Death, Fate and Doom. Seasonal Goddess of Winter.
Sehanine – Unaligned Goddess of Illusion, Love and the Moon. Seasonal God of Autumn and Patron of Elves.

Evil and Chaotic Evil deities
Asmodeus – Evil God of Tyranny and Domination. Lord of Devils
Bane – Evil God of War and Conquest. Revered by Goblins
Gruumsh – Chaotic Evil God of Slaughter and Destruction. Patron of Orcs
Lolth – Chaotic Evil Goddess of Shadow and Lies. Patron of Drow and their inseparable companions, the spiders.
Tharizdun – The Chained God, also known as the Elder Elemental Eye, creator of the Abyss.
Tiamat – Evil Goddess of Greed and Envy. Patron of the Chromatic Dragons.
Torog – Evil God of the Underdark. Patron of Jailors and Torturers
Vecna – Evil God of the Undead and Necromancy. Lord of Secrets
Zehir – Evil God of Darkness and Poison. Favoured Deity of the Yuan-Ti and Patron of Assassins.

Deceased and former deities
Amoth – God of Justice and Mercy. Killed by the demon princes Orcus, Demogorgon, and Rimmon.
Aoskar – God of Portals. Killed by the Lady of Pain.
Gorellik – God of Hunting, Beasts, and Gnolls. Killed by the demon lord Yeenoghu.
He Who Was – A god of good and possibly peace, he was killed by his archangel and exarch, Asmodeus. Implied to be the creator of humans, the devils wiped out all knowledge of his name, which they fear is powerful enough to revive him if it is ever spoken aloud again. The Nine Hells were originally his astral domain, now a prison for Asmodeus and his devils. A holy chalice belonging to him is mentioned in Divine Power.
 Khala – Goddess of Winter, wife of Zehir, Khala sought to trap the natural world in an eternal winter to secure power over it. Her plans convinced the primal spirits to expel gods and primordials from the world. She was killed by the other gods in a conflict called the War of Winter, who afterwards made a compact to balance darkness and light (Zehir and Pelor), and the natural seasons (Corellon, Pelor and Sehanine). Her power over winter was taken by the Raven Queen.
Lakal – God of Healing and Mercy who was also her own Astral Dominion. She was an impersonal deity who communicated with her chosen people, the Quom, through "ecstatic moments of personal communion." She extolled mercy and urged her followers to dedicate themselves to pursuits that benefited the whole cosmos. Lakal's death was accidental – when Bahamut battled Nihil, the Primordial of nothingness, the pair crashed into Lakal. Bahamut was able to use the distraction to slay Nihil, but the primordial's death throes also caused Lakal to explode. The surviving quom now roam the planes, retrieving any shards of Lakal that they can find, including those unknowingly consumed by living creatures. Such creatures, including humanoids and player characters, are considered collateral damage in the quom's quest to restore Lakal. Ironically, even if the quom succeed in their quest, the restored Lakal would be disgusted with their methods.
Maglubiyet – God of Goblinoids. Defeated by Bane.
Nerull – God of Death and the Dead. Killed by The Raven Queen.
Tuern – God of War. Killed by Bane.
 Nusemnee – Nusemnee was the daughter of Zehir. When she failed to assassinate a high priest of Pelor, she was abandoned and then mortally wounded by a paladin's holy blade. Expecting only death, she was surprised when the high priest healed her, showing her compassion and forgiveness. Intrigued, she decided to honor a promise to the high priest and aid him in his holy quest until a time that she could save his life in turn. Nusemnee thus became a symbol of redemption. When she finally died at the end of the high priest's quest, she rose again, this time as a minor goddess. In this form, she opposed her father by offering redemption to all who would turn away from evil. She was later killed by a poison that could kill anything—even a deity—that was distilled from Zehir's blood.

Dungeons & Dragons 5th edition 
These are the deities for the 5th edition of Dungeons & Dragons, which mostly are printed in the Appendix section of the 2014 5th edition Players Handbook. These include the deities from the Forgotten Realms, Greyhawk, Dragonlance, Eberron, and the deities derived from historical pantheons such as the Celtic deities and Norse deities. The historical deities have been removed from their historical aspect as to better serve the needs of the game.

The 2014 5th edition Dungeon Master's Guide later provided the "Dawn War Deities" as a sample pantheon, an updated version of the main pantheon of 4th edition. These updates included readjusting some of the alignments, because 5th edition returned to the previous schema of nine alignments, as well as adding suggested cleric domains of the available domains from the PHB and DMG.

The Sword Coast Adventurer's Guide from 2015 then gave a more detailed overview of all the deities from the Forgotten Realm, including nonhuman deities. A more detailed and expanded overview of nonhuman deties was printed in the 2018 Mordenkainen's Tome of Foes.

Deities of the Forgotten Realms 
Auril - Neutral evil goddess of winter. Auril's symbol is a six-pointed snowflake.
Azuth - Lawful neutral god of wizards. Azuth's symbol is a left hand pointing upward, outlined in fire.
Bane - Lawful evil god of tyranny. Bane's symbol is a black right hand, thumb and fingers together.
Beshaba - Chaotic evil goddess of misfortune.  Beshaba's symbol is a pair of black antlers.
Bhaal - Neutral evil god of murder. Bhaal's symbol is a skull surrounded by a ring of blood droplets.
Chauntea - Neutral good goddess of agriculture. Chauntea's symbol is a sheaf of grain, or a blooming rose over grain.
Cyric - Chaotic evil god of lies. Cyric's symbol is a jawless white skull on a purple or black sunburst.
Deneir - Neutral good god of writing. Deneir's symbol is a lit candle above an open eye.
Eldath - Neutral good goddess of peace. Eldath's symbol is a waterfall plunging into a still pool.
Gond - True neutral god of craft. Gond's symbol is a cog with four spokes.
Helm - Lawful neutral god of protection. Helm's symbol is a staring eye on an upright left gauntlet.
Ilmater - Lawful good god of endurance. Ilmater's symbol is two hands bound at the wrist by a red cord.
Kelemvor - Lawful neutral god of the dead. Kelemvor's symbol is an upright skeletal arm holding balanced scales.
Lathander - Neutral good god of birth and renewal. Lathander's symbol is a road travelling into a sunrise.
Leira - Chaotic neutral goddess of illusion. Liera's symbol is a triangle, pointing down, containing a swirl of mist.
Lliira -  Chaotic good goddess of joy. Lliira's symbol is a triangle of three six-pointed stars.
Loviatar - Lawful evil goddess of pain. Loviatar's symbol is a nine-tailed barbed scourge.
Malar - Chaotic evil god of the hunt. Malar's symbol is a clawed paw.
Mask - Chaotic neutral god of thieves. Mask's symbol is a black mask.
Mielikki - Neutral good goddess of forests. Mielikki's symbol is a unicorn's head.
Myrkul - Neutral evil god of death. Myrkul's symbol is a white human skull.
Mystra - Neutral good goddess of magic. Mystra's symbol is a circle of seven stars, or nine stars encircling a flowing red mist, or a single star.
Oghma - True neutral god of knowledge. Oghma's symbol is a blank scroll.
Savras - Lawful neutral god of divination and fate. Savras' symbol is a crystal ball containing many kinds of eyes.
Selûne - Chaotic good goddess of the moon. Selûne's symbol is a pair of eyes surrounded by seven stars.
Shar - Neutral evil goddess of darkness and loss. Shar's symbol is a black disk encircled with a border.
Silvanus - True neutral god of wild nature. Silvanus' symbol is an oak leaf.
Sune - Chaotic good goddess of love and beauty. Sune's symbol is the face of a beautiful red-haired woman.
Talona - Chaotic evil goddess of disease and poison. Talona's symbol is three tear drops on a triangle.
Talos - Chaotic evil god of storms. Talos' symbol is three lightning bolts radiating from a central point.
Tempus - True neutral god of war. Tempus' symbol is an upright flaming sword.
Torm - Lawful good god of courage and self-sacrifice. Torm's symbol is a white right gauntlet.
Tymora - Chaotic good goddess of good fortune and adventure. Tymora's symbol is a face-up coin.
Tyr - Lawful good god, representing justice and heroism. Tyr's symbol is a pair of balanced scales resting on a warhammer. He is based on the Norse deity Týr.
Umberlee - Chaotic evil goddess of the sea. Umberlee's symbol is an ocean wave curling left and right.
Waukeen - True neutral goddess of trade. Waukeen's symbol is an upright coin with Waukeen's profile facing left.

Deities of Greyhawk 
Beory - True neutral goddess of nature. Beory's symbol is a green disk.
Boccob - True neutral god of magic. Boccob's symbol is an eye within a pentagram.
Celestian - True neutral god of stars and wanderers. Celestian's symbol is an arc of seven stars inside a circle.
Ehlonna - Neutral good goddess of woodlands. Ehlonna's symbol is a unicorn horn.
Erythnul - Chaotic evil god of envy and slaughter. Erythnul's symbol is a single blood drop.
Fharlanghn - Neutral good god of horizons and exploration. Fharlanghn's symbol is a circle crossed by a curved horizon line.
Heironeous - Lawful good god of chivalry and war. Heironeous's symbol is a lightning bolt.
Hextor - Lawful evil god of war and discord. Hextor's symbol is six arrows facing downwards in a fan.
Kord - Chaotic good god of athletics and sport. Kord's symbol is four spears and four maces, radiating from a central point.
Incabulos - Neutral evil god of plague and famine. Incabulos' symbol is a reptilian eye with a horizontal diamond.
Istus - True neutral goddess of fate and destiny. Istus' symbol is a weaver's spindle with three strands.
Iuz - Chaotic evil god of pain and oppression. Iuz's symbol is a grinning human skull.
Nerull - Neutral evil god of death. Nerull's symbol is a skull with either a sickle or scythe.
Obad-Hai - True neutral god of nature. Obad-Hai's symbol is an oak leaf and acorn.
Olidammara - Chaotic neutral god of revelry. Olidammara's symbol is a laughing mask.
Pelor - Neutral good god of the sun and healing. Pelor's symbol is a sun.
Pholtus - Lawful good god of light and law. Pholtus' symbol is a silver sun, or a full moon partially eclipsed by a smaller crescent moon.
Ralishaz - Chaotic neutral god of ill luck and insanity. Ralishaz's symbol is three, bone fate-casting sticks.
Rao - Lawful good god of peace and reason. Rao's symbol is a white heart.
Saint Cuthbert - Lawful neutral god of common sense and zeal. Saint Cuthbert's symbol is a circle at the centre of starburst lines.
Tharizdun - Chaotic evil god of eternal darkness. Tharizdun's symbol is a dark spiral, or inverted ziggurat.
Trithereon - Chaotic good god of liberty and retribution. Trithereon's symbol is a triskelion.
Ulaa - Lawful good goddess of hills and mountains. Ulaa's symbol is a mountain with a circle at its heart.
Vecna - Neutral evil god of evil secrets. Vecna's symbol is a hand with an eye in its palm.
Wee Jas - Lawful Neutral goddess of magic and death. Wee Jas' symbol is a red skull in front of a fireball.

Deities of Dragonlance

Good aligned gods 
Paladine - Lawful good god of rulers and guardians. Paladine's symbol is a silver triangle.
Branchala - Neutral good god of music. Branchala's symbol is a bard's harp.
Habbakuk - Neutral good god of animal life and the sea. Habbakuk's symbol is a blue bird.
Kiri-Jolith - Lawful good god of honour and war. Kiri-Jolith's symbol is a pair of bison's horns.
Majere - Lawful good god of meditation and order. Majere's symbol is a copper spider.
Mishakal - Lawful good goddess of healing. Mishakal's symbol is a blue infinity sign.
Solinari - Lawful good goddess of good magic. Solinari's symbol is a white circle, or sphere.

Neutral aligned gods 
Gilean - True neutral god of knowledge. Gilean's symbol is an open book.
Chislev - True neutral goddess of nature. Chislev's symbol is a feather.
Reorx - True neutral god of craft. Reorx's symbol is a forging hammer.
Shinare - True neutral goddess of wealth and trade. Shinare's symbol is a griffon's wing.
Sirrion - True neutral god of fire and change. Sirrion's symbol is multi-coloured fire.
Zivilyn - True neutral god of wisdom. Zivilyn's symbol is a great green, or gold tree.
Lunitari - True neutral goddess of neutral magic. Lunitari's symbol is a red circle, or sphere.

Evil aligned gods 
Takhisis - Lawful evil goddess of night and hatred. Takhisis' symbol is a black crescent.
Chemosh - Lawful evil god of the undead. Chemosh's symbol is a yellow skull.
Hiddukel - Chaotic evil god of lies and greed. Hiddukel's symbol is a pair of broken merchant's scales.
Morgion - Neutral evil god of disease and secrecy. Morgion's symbol is a hood with two red eyes.
Sargonnas - Lawful evil god of vengeance and fire. Sargonnas' symbol is a stylized red condor.
Zeboim - Chaotic evil goddess of the sea and storms. Zeboim's symbol is a turtle shell.
Nuitari - Lawful evil god of evil magic. Nuitari's symbol is a black circle, or sphere.

Deities of Eberron

The Sovereign Host 
Arawai - Neutral good goddess of fertility. Arawai's symbol is a sheaf of wheat tied with a green ribbon.
Aureon - Lawful neutral god of law and knowledge. Aureon's symbol is an open tome.
Balinor - True neutral god of beasts and the hunt. Balinor's symbol is a pair of antlers.
Boldrei - Lawful good goddess of communication and home. Boldrei's symbol is a fire in a stone hearth.
Dol Arrah - Lawful good goddess of sunlight and honour. Dol Arrah's symbol is a rising sun.
Dol Dorn - Chaotic good god of strength at arms. Dol Dorn's symbol is a longsword crossed over a shield.
Kol Korran - True neutral god of trade and wealth. Kol Korran's symbol is a nine-sided gold coin.
Olladra - Neutral good goddess of good fortune. Olladra's symbol is a domino.
Onatar - Neutral good god of craft. Onatar's symbol is a crossed hammer and tongs.

The Dark Six 
The Devourer - Neutral evil god of nature's wrath. The Devourer's symbol is a bundle of five sharpened bones.
The Fury - Neutral evil goddess of wrath and madness. The Fury's symbol is a winged wyrm with a woman's head and upper body.
The Keeper - Neutral evil god of greed and death. The Keeper's symbol is a dragonshard stone in the shape of a fang.
The Mockery - Neutral evil god of violence and treachery. The Mockery's symbol is five blood-splattered tools.
The Shadow - Chaotic evil god of dark magic. The Shadow's symbol is an obsidian tower.
The Traveler - Chaotic neutral deity of chaos and change. The Traveler's symbol is four crossed, rune-inscribed bones.

Other Faiths of Eberron 
The Silver Flame - Lawful good deity of protection and good. The symbol of The Silver Flame is a flame drawn on silver, or moulded from silver.
The Blood of Vol - Lawful neutral philosophy of immortality and undeath. The symbol of The Blood of Vol is a stylised dragon skull on a red teardrop gem.
Cults of the Dragon Below - Neutral evil deities of madness. The symbol of The Cults of the Dragon Below is a stylised dragon skull.
The Path of Light - Lawful neutral philosophy of light and self-improvement. The symbol of The Path of Light is a brilliant crystal.
The Undying Court - Neutral good elven ancestors. The symbol of The Undying Court is a stylised skull.
The Spirits of the Past - Chaotic good elven ancestors. The symbol of The Spirits of the Past varies.

Nonhuman deities 
Bahamut - Lawful good dragon god of good. Bahamut's symbol is a Dragon's head in profile.
Blibdoolpoolp - Neutral evil kuo-toa goddess. Blibdoolpoolp's symbol is a lobster head in profile.
Corellon Larethian - Chaotic good elf deity of art and magic. Corellon Larethian's symbol is a quarter moon, or sunburst.
Deep Sashelas - Chaotic good elf god of the sea. Deep Sashelas' symbol is a dolphin.
Eadro - True neutral merfolk deity of the sea. Eadro's symbol is a spiral design.
Garl Glittergold - Lawful good gnome god of trickery and wiles. Garl Glittergold's symbol is a gold nugget.
Grolantor - Chaotic evil hill giant god of war. Grolantor's symbol is a wooden club.
Gruumsh - Chaotic evil orc god of storms and war. Gruumsh's symbol is an unblinking eye.
Hruggek - Chaotic evil bugbear god of violence. Hruggek's symbol is a morning star.
Kurtulmak - Lawful evil kobold god of war and mining. Kurtulmak's symbol is a gnome skull.
Laogzed - Chaotic evil troglodyte god of hunger. Laogzed's symbol is an image of the lizard/toad god.
Lolth - Chaotic evil drow goddess of spiders. Lolth's symbol is a spider.
Maglubiyet - Lawful evil goblinoid god of war. Maglubiyet's symbol is a bloody axe.
Moradin - Lawful good dwarf god of creation. Moradin's symbol is a hammer and anvil.
Rillifane Rallathil - Chaotic good wood elf god of nature. Rillifane Rallathil's symbol is an oak tree.
Sehanine Moonbow - Chaotic good elf goddess of the moon. Sehanine Moonbow's symbol is a crescent moon.
Sekolah - Lawful evil sahuagin god of the hunt. Sekolah's symbol is a shark.
Semuanya - True neutral lizardfolk deity of survival. Semuanya's symbol is an egg.
Skerrit - True neutral centaur and satyr god of nature. Skerrit's symbol is an oak growing from an acorn.
Skoraeus Stonebones - True neutral god of stone giants and art. Skoraeus Stonebones' symbol is a stalactite.
Surtr - Lawful evil god of fire giants and craft. Surtr's symbol is a flaming sword.
Thrym - Chaotic evil god of frost giants and strength. Thrym's symbol is a white double-bladed axe.
Tiamat - Lawful evil dragon goddess of evil. Tiamat's symbol is a dragon head with five claw marks.
Yondalla - Lawful good halfling goddess of fertility and protection. Yondalla's symbol is a shield.

Dawn War Deities
Asmodeus - Lawful evil god of tyranny.
Avandra - Chaotic good goddess of change and luck.
Bahamut - Lawful good god of justice and nobility.
Bane - Lawful evil god of war and conquest.
Corellon - Chaotic good god of magic and the arts.
Erathis - Lawful neutral goddess of civilization and invention.
Gruumsh - Chaotic evil god of destruction.
Ioun - Neutral goddess of knowledge.
Kord - Chaotic neutral god of strength and storms.
Lolth - Chaotic evil goddess of spiders and lies.
Melora - Neutral goddess of wilderness and the sea.
Moradin - Lawful good god of creation.
Pelor - Neutral good god of the sun and agriculture.
Raven Queen - Lawful good goddess of death.
Sehaine - Chaotic good goddess of the moon.
Tharizdun - Chaotic evil god of madness.
Tiamat - Lawful evil goddess of wealth, greed, and vengeance.
Torog - Neutral evil god of the Underdark.
Vecna - Neutral evil god of evil secrets.
Zehir - Chaotic evil god of darkness and poison.

See also 
 List of Greyhawk deities
 List of Forgotten Realms deities

References

Further reading
The 13 Strangest Deities In Dungeons & Dragons

Lists of fictional deities